Geophysical Service Inc. (often abbreviated GSI) was founded by John Clarence Karcher and Eugene McDermott in 1930 for the purpose of using refraction and reflection seismology to explore for petroleum deposits.

History
On December 6, 1941, the company was purchased by Eugene McDermott, Cecil Howard Green, J. Erik Jonsson, and H.B. Peacock.  During World War II, the company produced submarine detection devices.  In 1951, the company was renamed Texas Instruments (TI) with GSI as a division.  GSI was later sold by TI, repurchased, and finally sold again to Halliburton in 1988.  Halliburton also acquired GeoSource, a competing geophysical contractor (formerly Petty-Ray Geophysical), and attempted to merge the two companies. Unfortunately the rivalry between the two entities endured and the merged entity known as Halliburton Geophysical Services (HGS) proved to be far from profitable.  After several years of losses in 1994 Halliburton sold HGS to Western Atlas (formerly Western Geophysical until its merger with Dresser Atlas in 1987).  Western Atlas was bought by Baker Hughes in 1998 and was then merged into WesternGeco in 2000 through a joint venture with Schlumberger in which Schlumberger held the majority share (70%).

On 3 July 1981, MS Arctic Explorer, chartered to GSI for the purpose of conducting seismic surveys off the Labrador coast for British Petroleum, sank off St. Anthony, Newfoundland, in the Strait of Belle Isle, with the loss of 13 lives.

Present day operations
In 1992, Davey Einarsson, a longtime executive of the original GSI, purchased the proprietary rights to GSI’s speculative data in the Canadian offshore, launching the new GSI in Calgary. Paul Einarsson is the COO and Chairman of Geophysical Service Incorporated. He joined the company in 1997.

GSI is the largest owner of marine seismic data in Canada, with its head office located in Calgary, Alberta.

Recent developments:
GSI is currently involved in several cases of litigation for damages over disclosure of its confidential seismic data. The court challenges include litigation with the Canada-Newfoundland Offshore Petroleum Board,  the Canada-Nova Scotia Offshore Petroleum Board and companies that have obtained GSI data from a third party or government.

See also
 List of oilfield service companies

External links
 Geophysical Service Inc.

Oilfield services companies
Seismological observatories, organisations and projects
Petroleum in Texas
American companies established in 1930
Energy companies established in 1930
Non-renewable resource companies established in 1930
1930 establishments in Texas
Halliburton
Texas Instruments